Patient Number 9 is the thirteenth studio album by English heavy metal singer Ozzy Osbourne. It was released on 9 September 2022 through Epic Records and was produced by Andrew Watt.

Patient Number 9 received favourable reviews from music critics and won Best Rock Album at the 65th Annual Grammy Awards.

Background and promotion
Four days after the release of Ordinary Man, Osbourne announced that he had started working on its follow-up, with Andrew Watt returning as producer. On 24 June 2022, the lead single and title track, "Patient Number 9" featuring Jeff Beck, was released along with an accompanying music video. The music video was directed by Todd McFarlane and M. Wartella. The clip is the first-ever video to incorporate Osbourne's hand-drawn artwork. "My demons were animated and can be seen during the Jeff Beck guitar solo in the song," wrote Osbourne on Twitter. The track subsequently debuted at No. 1 on Billboards Hot Hard Rock Songs chart, while concurrently achieving debuts of Nos. 17 and 22 on Billboards Hot Rock Songs and Hot Rock & Alternative Songs, respectively. At the same time, Osbourne announced the album, cover, track listing and release date.

The second single "Degradation Rules", featuring Osbourne’s former Black Sabbath bandmate Tony Iommi, was unveiled on 22 July. Four days before the album release, on 5 September, the third single "Nothing Feels Right" featuring Zakk Wylde was published. Osbourne performed during the halftime show at the Los Angeles Rams' NFL season opener against the Buffalo Bills on 8 September in support of the album.

Critical reception

Patient Number 9 received generally positive reviews from contemporary music critics. At Metacritic, which assigns a normalised rating out of 100 to reviews from mainstream publications, the album received an average score of 75, based on 10 reviews, indicating "generally favorable reviews". 

AllMusic critic Fred Thomas gave the album a mostly positive review. He wrote: "Even with that fatalistic perspective sometimes peeking through, Ozzy sounds hypercharged throughout Patient Number 9, continuing the unlikely late-in-the-game comeback he began on Ordinary Man, and besting that album by taking more chances." 

Furthermore, writing for The Guardian, Alexis Petridis gave the album an overall positive review, implying that "By way of contrast, Patient Number 9 draws to a close with God Only Knows, a beautiful stadium rock ballad that features Osbourne contemplating his own mortality in terms that are alternately starkly affecting." 

Kerrang! gave the album 4 out of 5 and stated: "If nothing else, it's pleasing to see Ozzy still carrying on and still being the Prince of Darkness. But Patient Number 9 is also, like its predecessor, a massive celebration of life and friendship and the magic power of music. 'I'll never die, because I'm immortal!' he announces on Immortal. He sounds it."

Metal Hammer gave the album a positive review and stated: "Despite everything you may have heard about Ozzy being on his last legs, Patient Number 9 unequivocally does not sound like the work of a man living on borrowed time. Instead, it sounds like the Prince of fucking Darkness having an absolutely smashing time, with a bunch of his mates and, weirdly, a newfound sense of artistic ambition."

NME writer Rhian Daly gave Patient Number 9 almost perfect score and stated: "At 73 years old and battling with his health, you might not expect Osbourne to keep that bar particularly high. But, for the most part, Patient Number 9 does just that – it's a fizzing piece of hard-rock magic. The superstitious metal frontman might have revealed in a recent Independent interview that he tries to "avoid looking at" the number 13, but we're lucky to have his magnificent 13th solo album." 

Gareth Williams of Wall of Sound gave the album a positive review, saying that "There's no disguising one of rock's more unique voices and the singer sounds as good as he has in years. Although this album doesn't break any new ground it is streaks ahead of the likes of 2007's Black Rain or Scream from 2010. With Ordinary Man having blasted up the mainstream charts in 2020, Patient Number 9 won't be far behind."

At the 65th Annual Grammy Awards, Patient Number 9 received a total of four nominations, including Best Rock Album. The title track "Patient Number 9" received nominations for Best Rock Song and Best Rock Performance, and "Degradation Rules" was nominated for Best Metal Performance. The album would go on to win two Grammys, including Best Rock Album and Best Metal Performance for "Degradation Rules". This win makes it the third Grammy Award that Ozzy Osbourne and Tonny Iommi won together, after previously winning two as members of Black Sabbath.

Track listing

Notes
 The vinyl edition of the album features "Immortal" as the first track and "Patient Number 9" as the second.

Personnel
Credits adapted from official booklet.

 Ozzy Osbourne – lead vocals, harmonica (tracks 10, 13)

Additional musicians
 Andrew Watt – guitars (tracks 1-3, 5-13), bass (tracks 4, 6, 7, 9, 12), keyboards (tracks 1, 5-7, 11, 12), piano (tracks 3, 6, 12), drums (tracks 11, 12), backing vocals, production
 Zakk Wylde – guitars (tracks 1-3, 6-9, 11, 12), keyboards (tracks 1, 5, 7, 9), organ (track 8)
 Jeff Beck – guitars (tracks 1, 6)
 Tony Iommi – guitars (tracks 4, 10)
 Mike McCready – guitars (track 2)
 Eric Clapton – guitars (track 5)
 Josh Homme – guitars (track 12)
 Robert Trujillo – bass (tracks 1, 3, 7, 9-12)
 Duff McKagan – bass (tracks 2, 5)
 Chris Chaney – bass (track 8)
 Chad Smith – drums (tracks 1, 2, 4-6, 8-12), percussion (track 6)
 Taylor Hawkins – drums (tracks 3, 7, 12), percussion (track 3)
 James Poyser – organ (track 5)
 David Campbell – strings arrangement (tracks 6, 11)
 Charlie Bisharat – violin (tracks 6, 11)
 Roberto Cani – violin (track 6)
 Mario DeLeon – violin (track 6)
 Nina Evtuhov – violin (track 6)
 Songa Lee – violin (tracks 6, 11)
 Natalie Leggett – violin (tracks 6, 11)
 Philipp Levy – violin (track 6)
 Alyssa Park – violin (track 6)
 Michele Richards – violin (track 6)
 Neil Samples – violin (tracks 6, 11)
 Jennifer Takamatsu – violin (track 6)
 Kerenza Peackock – violin (track 11)
 Sara Parkins – violin (track 11)
 Andrew Duckles – viola (tracks 6, 11)
 Zachary Dellinger – viola (track 6)
 David Walther – viola (tracks 6, 11)
 Jacob Braun – cello (tracks 6, 11)
 Paula Hochhalter – cello (tracks 6, 11)
 Ross Gasworth – cello (track 6)

Charts

Weekly charts

Year-end charts

References

2022 albums
Ozzy Osbourne albums
Albums produced by Andrew Watt (record producer)
Epic Records albums
Grammy Award for Best Rock Album